Veilly is a commune in the Côte-d'Or department in eastern France. It is a remote farming village in Bourgogne-Franche-Comté.

Population

See also
Communes of the Côte-d'Or department

References

Communes of Côte-d'Or